Shiguang Road is a Shanghai Metro station in the city's Yangpu District. The station is the current northern terminus of Line 8 and is located on Zhongyuan Road between Kailu Road and Shiguang Road.

The station was opened on 29 December 2007 as part of the first phase of Shanghai Metro Line 8 from Shiguang Road to Yaohua Road. There are two side platforms, one for passengers boarding trains, and the other for disembarking trains. As the station is the northern terminus of the line, all passengers must exit the train. The train then travels north on a section of track to the depot at Zhongyuan Road and Guowei Road, where it is reversed and sent back into service southbound.

Exits 
 Exit 1: Kailu Road, east side of Zhongyuan Road
 Exit 2: Shiguang Road, east side of Zhongyuan Road
 Exit 3: Shiguang Road, west side of Zhongyuan Road
 Exit 4: Kailu Road, west side of Zhongyuan Road

Surface connections 
Passengers can transfer to bus routes 537, 538, 577, 726, 758, 813, 817, and 870 at the station.

References 

Railway stations in Shanghai
Railway stations in China opened in 2007
Shanghai Metro stations in Yangpu District
Line 8, Shanghai Metro